Joseph Serge Miot (23 November 1946 – 12 January 2010) was a Haitian archbishop of the Roman Catholic Church. He was the ninth Archbishop of Port-au-Prince, serving from 2008 until his death as a result of the 12 January 2010 earthquake.

Biography
Miot was born in Jérémie, Grand'Anse on 23 November 1946. He was ordained to the priesthood on 4 July 1975 in the Diocese of Jérémie.

On 29 July 1997, he was appointed Coadjutor Archbishop of Port-au-Prince by Pope John Paul II, because the people had been displeased with Archbishop François-Wolff Ligondé's supposed encouragement of the coup movement — the archdiocesan offices were burned in retribution.  Archbishop Miot received his episcopal consecration on the following 12 October from Archbishop Christophe Pierre, with Archbishops François Gayot, SMM, and Ligondé serving as co-consecrators.

During his tenure, he denounced the incarceration of Fr. Gérard Jean-Juste by the government of Prime Minister Gérard Latortue; Miot later suspended Father Jean-Juste after the priest disobeyed orders to not present himself as a political candidate.

Miot succeeded Ligondé, becoming the ninth Archbishop of Port-au-Prince upon the latter's resignation on 1 March 2008.

The Port-au-Prince Cathedral, archdiocese offices, and many other churches were destroyed by the earthquake on 12 January 2010.  Miot was killed when the force of the quake threw him off his balcony at the papal nunciature.  Archbishop Bernardito Auza, Apostolic Nuncio to Haiti, the Apostolic Administrator of the Archdiocese, said that he originally sought an immediate burial for Miot, but that it would have conflicted with local tradition.  Miot was buried at Lilavois Cemetery on 23 January 2010 immediately after his funeral Mass. Celebrants presiding at the funeral Mass included Timothy, Cardinal Dolan, Archbishop of New York and chairman of the board of Catholic Relief Services; Thomas Wenski, Bishop of Orlando; and Archbishop Bernardito Auza.

See also
 Rev. Sam Dixon
 Zilda Arns

References

External links
 

1946 births
2010 deaths
20th-century Roman Catholic bishops in Haiti
21st-century Roman Catholic archbishops in Haiti
Victims of the 2010 Haiti earthquake
Burials in Port-au-Prince
Haitian Roman Catholic archbishops
Roman Catholic archbishops of Port-au-Prince